Tranmere Rovers F.C. played the 1962–63 season in the Football League Fourth Division, where they finished 8th of 24. They reached the Third Round of the FA Cup, and the First Round of the League Cup.

Football League

References 

Tranmere Rovers F.C. seasons